The 1913 SAFL Grand Final was an Australian rules football competition. Port Adelaide beat North Adelaide by 54 to 40.

References 

SANFL Grand Finals
SAFL Grand Final, 1913